Adrian Thorpe (born 25 November 1963), also known as Aidey Thorpe, is an English former footballer who made more than 150 Football League appearances playing as a winger or a forward.

Career
Born in Chesterfield in 1963, Thorpe started his career with Mansfield Town. He moved to non-league Heanor Town, before he returned to the Football League in July 1985 with Bradford City following their promotion to Division Two. He played 17 league games, scoring just once, and also had a loan spell with Tranmere Rovers, before he moved to Notts County in November 1987 for £50,000. He went on to play with Walsall and Northampton Town before he moved to Hong Kong with Instant-Dict.

References

1963 births
Living people
Footballers from Chesterfield
English footballers
Association football wingers
Association football forwards
Mansfield Town F.C. players
Heanor Town F.C. players
Bradford City A.F.C. players
Tranmere Rovers F.C. players
Notts County F.C. players
Walsall F.C. players
Northampton Town F.C. players
Double Flower FA players
Arnold Town F.C. players
English Football League players
Expatriate footballers in Hong Kong
English expatriate sportspeople in Hong Kong
English expatriate footballers